1979 in professional wrestling describes the year's events in the world of professional wrestling.

List of notable promotions 
Only one promotion held notable shows in 1979.

Calendar of notable shows

Notable events
In March, the World Wide Wrestling Federation (WWWF) was renamed to World Wrestling Federation (WWF).

Accomplishments and tournaments

JCP

Awards and honors

Pro Wrestling Illustrated

Championship changes

EMLL

NWA

Births
January 17 - Chase Stevens 
 February 21 – Carly Colón 
 March 4 – Sarah Stock
 March 6 – David Flair
 March 9 – Melina
 March 12 – Nidia Guenard
 March 17 – Samoa Joe
 March 23 - Ray Gordy
 March 28 - Goldy Locks 
 April 5 - Mohamad Ali Vaez
 April 19 – Nicole Raczynski 
 April 25 - Belladonna (d. 2019) 
 April 29 - Vladimir Kozlov
 May 3 - Monsta Mack 
 May 4 - Ryan Shamrock 
 May 11 - Air Paris 
 May 26 – Ashley Massaro (d. 2019)
 May 29 – Brian Kendrick
 June 19 - Billy Reil 
 June 25 - Hirooki Goto 
 July 18 – Joey Mercury
 July 19 – Pólvora
 July 20 - Adam Rose 
 July 21 - Matt Stryker 
 July 23 
 Peter Rosenberg
 Perro Aguayo Jr. (d. 2015)
 July 27 – Shannon Moore
 July 31 - R. J. Brewer 
 August 9 - Silas Young 
 August 10 - Kongo Kong
 August 31 – Mickie James
 September 5 - Slyck Wagner Brown 
 September 6 – Low Ki
 September 26 - Naomichi Marufuji
 October 1 – Curtis Axel
 October 3 – John Morrison
 October 8 – Paul Burchill 
 October 14 – Stacy Keibler
 October 19 – Mari Apache
 October 25 – Rosa Mendes
 October 27 – Bobby Fish
 November 2 – Cliff Compton
 November 5 - Jackson Andrews 
 November 7 - Joey Ryan
 November 12 - Matt Cappotelli (d. 2018) 
 November 17 
 Katsuyori Shibata
 Meiko Satomura
 November 21 - Ryota Hama
 December 3 – Seth Petruzelli
 December 10 - Matt Bentley
 December 15 – Eric Young
 December 16:
Luke Harper/Brodie Lee (d. 2020)
Murat Bosporus
 December 18 - Eric Escobar 
 December 24 – Chris Hero
 December 26 - Hiroshi Nagao
 December 29 - Justin Roberts

Debuts
 Uncertain debut date 
 Barry Windham
 Jim Duggan

Deaths
 June 30 – Chris Taylor, 29
 July 14 - Billy McCrary, 32
 July 22 - Tony Galento, 69
 October 11 - Lou Bastien, 63

Retirements
 Spiros Arion (1961 - 1979)
 Boris Malenko (1955 - 1979)

References

 
professional wrestling